Chirodini ... Tumi Je Aamar (English: You Are Mine Eternally) is a 2008 Indian Bengali romantic drama film directed by Raj Chakraborty, making his directional debut in Tollywood. This is a remake of Tamil film Kaadhal (2004) directed by Balaji Sakthivel.

Plot
Krishna (Rahul Banerjee) is a diligent scooter mechanic in Siliguri and life goes on smoothly for him until the rich schoolgirl Pallavi (Priyanka Sarkar) sets her eyes on him. The infatuation reaches dangerous levels when she coaxes Krishna to take her away from the clutches of her family, which has other plans about her future. The film begins with the elopement, as Pallavi steps out of her house in her school uniform, leaving even her wristwatch behind since Krishna has instructed her not to take a single thing with her. The two rush into a shopping mall where Pallavi hurriedly changes into a boy's shirt, pants and cap, leaves her uniform behind, and the two board the bus.

The flashback, as point-of-view narrations between Pallavi and Krishna, are intercut with Pallavi's don-like father and uncle terrorizing the neighbourhood in search of the truant girl. Krishna hesitantly yields to her charm and the two run away to Kolkata. Krishna's friend Ali (Rudranil Ghosh) and his group at Kolkata helps them, and the lovers marry. The couple consummates their union while the mess chaps hastily organize a proper wedding and elaborate reception.

The family tracks down the couple and offers to come back. While coming back Pallavi's family separates them. Krishna gets beaten by her father's gang. Pallavi agrees to marry another man to save Krishna's life and loses sense. Krishna took one bangle of Pallavi's hand and leaves that place. While she believes this decision is best and moves on with her life.

A couple of years later, Pallavi is married to a different man and has a baby with him. One day, along with her husband and baby, she comes across a mad man on the streets. Pallavi soon realizes that the insane man is none other than Krishna as she spots her name on his chest which he had carved as a sign of love all those years ago. Krishna had lost his memory and sanity from the grievous assault at the hands of Pallavi's father and relatives which resulted into the permanent damage of his brain. She slips into a complete state of shock as she witnesses Krishna's pitiable condition. She tries to revive his memory and bring him back to his senses. However, Krishna's condition had reached the worst phase and he doesn't recognize her even after her constant persuasion. He leaves her and walks away leaving Pallavi in utter sorrow and guilt as she blames herself for Krishna's ill fate.

Cast
 Rahul Banerjee - Krishna
 Priyanka - Pallavi
 Rudranil Ghosh - Ali Krishna's Friend
  Tina Datta - Priyanka, Pallavi's Friend
 Tamal Roy Chowdhury - Pallavi's Father
 Rita Koiral - Pallavi's Mother
Tulika Basu - Pallavi's Aunt
 Supriyo Dutta - Pallavi's Uncle
 Diya Mukherjee - Pallavi's friend
 Aritra Dutta Banik - Helper Mechanic of Krishna
 Gita Dey - Pallavi's Grand Mother
 Dev - Abir

Soundtrack

The music of Chirodini Tumi Je Amar, composed by Jeet Gannguli was released in India on 15 August 2008  The soundtrack was at the number one spot on the music charts for several consecutive weeks. The media partner of Chirodini Tumi Je Amar is Bengali music channel Sangeet Bangla.

Box office and ratings
Mahendra Soni of Shree Venkatesh Films spent ₹1 crore on making the movie and they have earned about ₹2 crore. Chirodini released with 40 prints and Venkatesh is coming up with some more.

Reviews and critiques
The Telegraph reviewed that movie: "Chirodini... Tumi Je Aamar could as well be a version of QSQT or any other tragic teen love story done to death on screen. But Raj Chakraborty’s directorial debut turns the cliche on its head and makes a two-hour-20-minute entertainer, without the tackiness, sloppiness and meaningless melodrama typical of mainstream Tollywood ... Chirodini’s strength is its screenplay — smart, crisp and racy with neat shot divisions, life-like situations and convincing characters."

Screenindia.com comments that "The script begins to falter after the diabolic uncle takes the couple away, but till then it is smooth-sailing. Priyanka and Rahul offer the freshness Bengali cinema was dying to get for many years. They are young, absolutely new and have tried to do as much justice to the script as they could though the script backs Priyanka more than Rahul. The original touch is that the film opens with the couple’s elopement after top-angle shots of the city of Kolkata panning across to cover people going about their daily lives including a madman who roams aimlessly across the streets. The love affair in the first half is a bit repetitive and the scenes in the girl’s home are superfluous."

"Preetam Choudhury’s production design is mind-blowing and realistic. Jeet’s music ably complemented with Gautam-Susmit’s lyrics blend into the theme and story of the film very well. Premendu Bikash Chaki’s cinematography is brilliant in the second half but not so good in the first. This is a good debut where the footage is too long and the dream scenes stick out like sore thumbs. Raj has also made Priyanka prance around in a towel but it does not look vulgar. A good debut by a young director. One only hopes he can sustain the standard he has established with his first film. The film deserves one star for production design, one star for acting and one for the cinematography."

References

External links
 

2008 films
2000s Bengali-language films
Bengali-language Indian films
Films set in Kolkata
Indian romantic drama films
Films scored by Jeet Ganguly
Films scored by Chandan Sharma
Bengali remakes of Tamil films
Films directed by Raj Chakraborty
2008 directorial debut films
2008 romantic drama films